Otter Township is a township in Warren County, Iowa, USA.

History
This township is named for the otter, which was once hunted within its borders.

References

Townships in Warren County, Iowa
Townships in Iowa